Zucker is a German word meaning "sugar" and may refer to:

 Zucker (surname)
 Zücker, an album by the Fastbacks
 Zucker (Rosenstolz album), an album by Rosenstolz
 Zucker laboratory rat breed

See also
 Zucker, Abrahams and Zucker, a comedy filmmaking trio
 Zuker, a surname
 Alles auf Zucker!, a German comedy film, released internationally in 2004
 Zuckermann